Miss Kosovo (Miss Kosova) is a national Beauty pageant in Kosovo. Since 2008, Miss Kosova is responsible for selecting the country's representative to Miss Earth, which is an annual international beauty pageant promoting environmental awareness.

History

1994–2007: Early years
In the years 1998, 2004 and 2005, the contest was not held. Between 1994 and 2007, whilst Kosovo was a part of Yugoslavia or just Serbia, the contest was confined to Kosovo and recognized only by its organizers. Pre-2008 winners of the contest were able to represent Miss Albania owing to agreements with its sister organisation across the border.
 
Two winners had a successful pageant in Miss Albania: Venera Mustafa (1999 winner of both titles) and Agnesa Vuthaj (winning Miss Kosovo 2003 and Miss Albania 2004), who also participated internationally as Miss Albania.

2008–2012: Miss Earth franchise
From 2008 after independence was declared, Miss Kosovo has been permitted to take part at the Miss Earth pageant. The Miss Kosovo pageant is organized by former titleholder Agnesa Vuthaj under her Agnesa Vuthaj Association. After Kosovo's declaration of independence, Miss Kosovo 2007 Yllka Berisha participated in the Miss Earth 2008 pageant but was unplaced. The Kosovar delegates from 2002 and 2003 for Miss Earth were from a different organization.

2013–present: Miss Earth with Miss Universe

In 2013 Fadil Berisha and Agnesa Vuthaj took control of Miss Kosovo and retrieved the Miss Universe franchise. This happened after the previous Miss Universe Kosovo directors made the decision to send their winner to Miss World. Hence, there are two titleholders from this pageant - one for Miss Universe and one for Miss Earth.

Titleholders

Miss Kosova

This list includes from the inception of Miss Kosova where the winners were usually sent to Miss Earth from 2008, until before the merging of the Miss Universe and Miss Earth franchises.

See also
Miss Universe Kosovo

References

External links 
 Miss Kosova

 
Beauty pageants in Kosovo
Recurring events established in 1994
1994 establishments in Yugoslavia
Kosovan awards